"Treat Myself" is a song recorded by American singer Victoria Justice, released as the lead single from her upcoming debut studio album or solo EP on December 11, 2020. It was written by Justice, Jonny Pakfar, Shane Eli Abrahams, and Tayler Buono.

Background
Justice took a break after starring in the 2016 film The Rocky Horror Picture Show: Let's Do the Time Warp Again and performing on its soundtrack. On December 8, 2020, after a hiatus of over four years, she announced she would release a song titled "Treat Myself", as a promise to her fans and herself to release new music that year, stating she had hoped to release an album or extended play, but "2020 has not exactly turned out as many of us planned" and "instead of overthinking all of this, I just thought. F#%! it. I'm going to just put it out there". The day before, she uploaded a snippet of the song on her social media accounts.

Composition
"Treat Myself" is a soft pop song. Inquisitr's Treva Bowdoin noted "real, raw" lyrics are about "the need to engage in some serious self-care".

Critical reception
Billboards Jason Lipshutz and Gab Ginsberg placed the song on the list of "10 cool new pop songs to get you through the week", calling the track "lovely" and adding it's "with its unfussy production, a good reminder of her vocal skill." Idolators Mike Wass stated "her first single in seven years was worth the wait. 'Treat Myself' is a raw, emotional ballad with deeply relatable lyrics", adding that the song is "very good" at the end of the review. Elite Dailys Brendan Wetmore wrote the song "was the perfect single to kickstart her new venture into a full-time career as a pop star, and a perfect way to close out 2020", stating Justice's vocal is "perfectly suited for modern pop tropes, like soft guitar plucks and haunting choruses", comparing it to Olivia Rodrigo's hit single "Drivers License" released a month later.

Music video
The music video for the song was released on December 16, 2020. It was directed by John Logsdon and Patrick Dwyer.

References

2020 songs
2020 singles
Songs written by Victoria Justice
Victoria Justice songs